Red Earth is a 2007 studio album by Dee Dee Bridgewater. It carries the subtitle "A Malian Journey" to celebrate and explore her African and Malian ancestry. The album brought her the seventh nomination for Best Jazz Vocal Album at the 2008 Grammy Awards. On Billboard's Top Jazz Album chart it reached Number 16.

Reception
John L. Walters of The Guardian stated "After a few underwhelming "crossover" projects, US singer Dee Dee Bridgewater has made a cracking album that unites great jazz singing with the Malian griot tradition. Red Earth is neither fusion nor compromise but a happy meeting of African musicianship and Afro-American romanticism. Mostly recorded in Bamako, it includes several Malian songs: a sparkling version of Kassé Mady Diabaté's Bad Spirits (Bani), featuring Toumani Diabaté, and a joyous duet with Ramata Diakité on the latter's Mama Don't Ever Go Away (Mama Digna Sara Ye). Bridgewater makes a point of incorporating music and performances by several fine women singers and writers: Oumou Sangare, Mamani Keita, Fatamata "Mama" Kouyaté (on the bluesy title track) and Tata Kouyaté on Bambo (No More), her famous protest against forced marriage. An amazing cast of Malian musicians make classics such as Afro Blue and Long Time Ago (Wayne Shorter's Footprints with lyrics) sound reborn, giving Nina Simone's Four Women new depth and power. Wonderful."

Track listing
All compositions by Dee Dee Bridgewater, except as noted.

"Afro Blue" (Mongo Santamaría, Oscar Brown, Jr.) – 5:11
"Bad Spirits" – 5:49
"Dee Dee" (Baba Sissoko, Bridgewater) – 2:57
"Mama Don't Ever Go Away" – 5:39
"Long Time Ago" (Wayne Shorter, Bridgewater) – 6:48
"Children Go 'Round" – 6:05
"The Griots" – 6:04
"Oh My Love" – 6:03
"Four Women" (Nina Simone) – 5:24
"No More" – 4:45
"Red Earth" – 5:17
"Meanwhile" (Edsel Gomez, Bridgewater) – 4:25
"Compared to What" (Gene McDaniels, Lassy "King" Massassy) – 5:21

All tracks recorded in Bamako (Mali) at Studio Bogolan except tracks 11, 12 and 13 recorded in Paris at Davout studios.

Personnel 
Dee Dee Bridgewater - Vocals
Edsel Gomez - Piano
Ira Coleman - Bass
Minino Garay - Drums, percussion, background vocals
plus alternating line-ups with
Cheick Tidiane Seck - Fender Rhodes, Hammond organ, shakeres, calebasse, karignan, background vocals
Ramata Diakité - Vocals (track 4)
Mamani Keïta - Vocals (3), background vocals
Fatoumata "Mama" Kouyaté - Vocals (11), background vocals
Kabiné Kouyaté - Vocals (7), background vocals
Tata "Bambo" Kouyaté - Vocals (10)
Amy Sacko - Vocals (6), background vocals
Oumou Sangaré - Vocals (8)
Lassy "King" Massassy - Rap vocals (13)
Fatou - background vocals
Baba Sissoko - Balafon, ngoni, tamani and vocals (3)
Lansiné Kouyaté - Balafon
Habib "Dia" Sangaré - Bolon
Alou Kouloubali - Calebasse
"Petit" Adama Diarra - Djembe
Cheick "Sékou" Oumar - Djembe
Djifli Mamadou Sanogo - Djembe
Moussa Sissikho - Djembe (soloist)
Maré Sanogo - Doum-doum
Lamine Tounkara - Doum-doum
Aly Wagué - Flute (5, 9)
Gabriel Durand - Guitar
Modibo Kouyaté - Guitar
Jacob Soubeiga - Guitar
Djelimady Tounkara - Guitar (soloist)
Mamadou Diabaté - Kora
Cherif Samano - Kora
Yakhoba Sissokho - Kora (soloist)
Benogo Diakité - Kamale ngoni (soloist)
Moriba Koïta - Ngoni (soloist)
Bassekou Kouyaté - Ngoni (soloist)
Adama Tounkara - Ngoni
"Pepito" Sekouba Kouyaté - Tama
Moussa Sissoko - Tama

Chart positions

References 

 Liner notes

Dee Dee Bridgewater albums
2007 albums
Malian culture